Giorgio Aebi (9 September 1923 – 14 January 2005) was an Italian footballer who played as a forward. He spent most of his career in Calcio Como. He was the son of Ermanno Aebi, who was a forward for Inter Milan.

References

1923 births
2005 deaths
Sportspeople from the Province of Como
Italian footballers
Association football forwards
Como 1907 players
Genoa C.F.C. players
S.P.A.L. players
Italian people of Swiss descent
Footballers from Lombardy
People from Cernobbio